"Radio" is the first single from Musiq Soulchild's fifth studio album OnMyRadio, his second full-length release on Atlantic Records.

It charted at #55 on Billboard'''s Hot R&B/Hip-Hop Songs chart.

The video premiered August 13, 2008 on BET's Access Granted''.

Chart position

References

2008 singles
Musiq Soulchild songs
2008 songs
Atlantic Records singles
Songs written by Musiq Soulchild